Ultimate was one of the events in flying disc at the 2001 World Games in Akita. It was played from 19 to 21 August. The competition took place at Akita Prefectural Central Park Football Studiume.

Competition format
A total of 6 teams entered the competition. In preliminary stage they play round-robin tournament. The best four teams advances to the semifinals.

Results

Preliminary stage

Semifinals

Fifth place match

Bronze medal match

Gold medal match

Final ranking

References

External links
 Results on IWGA website

Flying disc at the 2001 World Games